"Milwaukee, Here I Come" is a song written by Lee Fykes and recorded as a duet by American country singers George Jones and Brenda Carter.  The single, released on the Musicor label, was a hit, reaching #13 on the Billboard country singles chart.  Carter was also signed to Musicor, which is the main reason she was brought in to sing with Jones on the track, and in an interview with Music City News in the summer of 1968, Jones expressed interest in producing the seventeen-year-old Maynardville, Tennessee singer.  However, Jones would soon make several television appearances singing "Milwaukee, Here I Come" with Tammy Wynette, whom he married in 1969.

Porter Wagoner and Dolly Parton also covered the song, including it on their 1969 album Always, Always.

John Prine covered it with Melba Montgomery on his Grammy-nominated 1999 album In Spite of Ourselves.

1968 singles
1968 songs
Milwaukee in fiction
Songs about Wisconsin
Song recordings produced by Pappy Daily